George Mathison (24 November 1909 – 19 April 1989) was an English footballer who made 140 appearances in the Football League playing for Newcastle United, Lincoln City and Gateshead. He began his career with his local team, Walker Celtic, and was also on the books of Burnley and Hartlepools United without representing either in the league. He did play one competitive match for Hartlepools, in the Third Division North Cup in 1938. He played as a wing half or centre half.

References

External links
 Profile at Toon1892

1909 births
1989 deaths
Footballers from Newcastle upon Tyne
English footballers
Association football wing halves
Walker Celtic F.C. players
Newcastle United F.C. players
Lincoln City F.C. players
Gateshead F.C. players
Burnley F.C. players
Hartlepool United F.C. players
English Football League players
Place of death missing